Khuất Hữu Long (born 19 February 1987) is a Vietnamese retired footballer who plays as a defender. He was called up once for the Vietnam national football team but did not play.

References

1987 births
Living people
Vietnamese footballers
Association football defenders
V.League 1 players
Hoang Anh Gia Lai FC players